Storm Willis Norton (born May 16, 1994) is an American football offensive tackle for the New Orleans Saints of the National Football League (NFL). He played college football at Toledo and signed with the Detroit Lions as an undrafted free agent in 2017.

Professional career

Detroit Lions
Norton signed with the Detroit Lions as an undrafted free agent on May 12, 2017. He was waived on September 2, 2017, and was signed to the Lions' practice squad the next day. He was promoted to the active roster on September 9, 2017. He was waived two days later and was re-signed to the practice squad. He was released on September 25, 2017. He was re-signed to the practice squad on October 26, 2017, but was released a few days later.

Arizona Cardinals
On November 6, 2017, Norton was signed to the Arizona Cardinals' practice squad. On November 30, 2017, Norton was released by the Cardinals.

Minnesota Vikings
On December 12, 2017, Norton was signed to the Minnesota Vikings' practice squad. He was released on January 16, 2018. He signed a reserve/future contract with the Vikings on January 29, 2018.

On September 1, 2018, Norton was waived by the Vikings and was signed to the practice squad the next day. He was promoted to the active roster on October 27, 2018. He was waived again on November 3, 2018, and re-signed to the practice squad. He signed a reserve/future contract with the Vikings on January 2, 2019.

On August 31, 2019, Norton was waived by the Vikings.

Los Angeles Wildcats (XFL)
Norton was selected first overall in the second phase by the Los Angeles Wildcats in the 2020 XFL Draft. Pro Football Focus named Norton as the highest rated offensive lineman during the COVID-19 pandemic shortened XFL season. He had his contract terminated when the league suspended operations on April 10, 2020.

Los Angeles Chargers
Norton signed with the Los Angeles Chargers on April 14, 2020.

New Orleans Saints
On March 16, 2023, Norton signed a one-year contract with the New Orleans Saints.

References

External links
Toledo Rockets bio

1994 births
Living people
Arizona Cardinals players
Detroit Lions players
Los Angeles Chargers players
Los Angeles Wildcats (XFL) players
Minnesota Vikings players
Players of American football from Ohio
Sportspeople from Toledo, Ohio
Toledo Rockets football players